Tallis is the English variation of the ancient name Thales, most notably Thales of Miletus.

Tallis may refer to the following people:

Given name
Tallis Obed Moses (born c. 1954), President of Vanuatu

Surname
Canon Tallis, a major character in the young adult novels of Madeleine L'Engle
Cedric Tallis (1914–1991), American baseball executive 
 Gorden Tallis (born 1973), Australian rugby league player
 John Tallis (1817–1876), English cartographic publisher
Tallis Directory, is a gazetteer of Gravesend written and published by John 
 Raymond Tallis (born 1946), English geriatrician and intellectual
Sonja Tallis (born 1943), Australian actress, singer and drama teacher
Steve Tallis (born 1952), Australian singer-songwriter and guitarist
 Thomas Tallis (1505–85), English composer
 The Tallis Scholars, British early music ensemble named after the composer
Thomas Tallis School in Greenwich, London, England